Lankhmar – City of Adventure is an accessory for the Dungeons & Dragons fantasy role-playing game, first published by TSR in 1985.

Contents
The two booklet set describes Nehwon and the city of Lankhmar, from Fritz Leiber's Fafhrd and the Grey Mouser series. It includes information on the city's districts, factions and guilds, characters, and the gods and monsters of Nehwon, as well as encounter tables and adventure ideas.

The larger book begins by detailing summaries of the Fafhrd and the Grey Mouser stories, and provides comments on the stories' potential for further adventures. Next is a district-by-district breakdown of Lankhmar, with detailed maps that mark and describe 99 locations, as well as record sheets for the Dungeon Master's (DM's) campaign notes. Another annotated map details the world of Nehwon, followed by descriptions of almost 100 non-player characters (NPCs), including statistics for Fafhrd and the Grey Mouser in Legends & Lore format; the gods and monsters of Nehwon are also presented, adding to those already appearing in Legends & Lore.

The book goes on to describe the workings of the city, including details on its political factions, guilds, and religions, as well as a chapter on adventuring in Lankhmar with rules on haggling, bribery, the legal system, and Social Levels. There is also a section on generating new NPCs and buildings, which includes sample building plans. The book also includes a series of conversion rules for fitting the setting into the AD&D game system. There is a series of set-piece encounters for providing random incidents, or even starting points for adventures, as well as a scenario for 9th-12th level adventurers titled "The Karvian Elephant".

The color map includes a number of areas in grey, which the DM can design. The map of Lankhmar depicts a crowded city with roads and alleys winding around the houses; in the middle of each city block is a large blank area that represents the narrow backstreets of Lankhmar, those areas about which the casual passer-by knows nothing. It is only after leaving the main streets and venturing into the inner areas of Lankhmar that these areas become known to the player characters (PCs).

The smaller booklet contains a series of city block geomorphs which can also be used to fill in the blank areas on the map. Whenever the PCs venture into the backstreets, the GM selects one of 12 geomorphs to fill the empty area, and each geomorph shows the layout of buildings in the backstreets. The smaller booklet also contains record sheets, duplicate maps, and other information for players.

Publication history
Lankhmar – City of Adventure was designed by Bruce Nesmith, Douglas Niles, and Ken Rolston, with a cover by Keith Parkinson and interior illustrations by Jeff Easley, and was first published by TSR for the Advanced Dungeons & Dragons game system in 1985 as a 96-page book with a back cover pocket, a 32-page districts book with record sheets, handouts, and pre-generated characters from the stories for players, and a poster-size, full-color map of the city of Lankhmar. Additional research was by Steve Mecca, and editing was by Anne Gray McCready and Barbara Green Deer.  The set was updated in 1993 under the same name for use with second edition Advanced Dungeons & Dragons.

Reception
Graeme Davis reviewed Lankhmar – City of Adventure for White Dwarf, and gave it 10/10 overall. Davis notes that the Social Levels rule "makes a valuable addition to the AD&D game rules", and the sample building plans are "useful in any context—Lankhmar or otherwise".  Davis was concerned whether the AD&D game system "could fit a pre-existing, detailed fictional setting without the obvious strain that showed in the Conan AD&D modules", but said the chapter on conversion rules eased his fears, continuing: "There is a little spanner-work necessary, especially with spellcasters, but the adjustments work surprisingly well once you get used to them, and little or none of the flavour of the original setting is lost." He called the adjustments in the accessory "forgivable" and "necessary" and the color map "a thing of beauty".  He recommended the book to both fans of the stories and fans of AD&D, and concluded the review by calling Lankhmar "a delight", "simply the best city module ever to see print", and "a beauty."

Jim Bambra reviewed Lankhmar City of Adventure for Dragon magazine No. 136 (August 1988). Bambra felt that the set described "a city that is full of atmosphere and has a distinctive character", but cautioned that "Lankhmar’s character is also one of its weaknesses, as the city is very closely tied to the world and characters created by novelist Fritz Leiber," which would make it hard to fit this supplement into a more conventional AD&D game setting. Bambra described it further: "It's a living and breathing city, a place where Leiber’s heroes Fafhrd and the Gray Mouser can really feel at home. [...] The supplement's designers have done an excellent job of capturing the atmosphere of the city; you can almost smell the smoke and stench as you read through the supplement's main book."

Bambra felt that the Lankhmar pack is all about the opportunity for a game master to create a city in as much detail as desired, and that the pack contains enough background to make designing a city really easy. Bambra pointed out omissions that he considered minor annoyances: "There is no Rainbow Palace flow chart for conducting fights and chases in the palace, no Nehwon wandering monster encounter chart (although this is referenced twice in the book), and no new spells that were promised for spell-casters." Bambra called the book "easily one of the best city supplements ever published" but also "limited in its use", saying the game has to be played in Leiber's world to get the full effect, calling it "unique but narrow in scope".  He concluded his review by saying, "So, we have an excellent city pack that doesn't fit very easily into mainstream AD&D game play—-a situation that tends to mark the Lankhmar pack as an inspirational reference work rather than a living and breathing city. This is, of course, unless you’re a big Leiber fan who enjoys thief- and fighter-oriented adventures; in this case, Lankhmar is a dream come true."

Lawrence Schick, in his 1991 book Heroic Worlds, calls the set "Easily one of the best campaign settings for AD&D, it's designed so that each GM who uses it will create an individualized Lankhmar by selecting detail maps and locations to suit."

References

External links
Review in Games International

Dungeons & Dragons sourcebooks
Nehwon
Role-playing games based on novels
Role-playing game supplements introduced in 1985